Thirteen Anniversaries is a composition for solo piano by Leonard Bernstein, published in 1988, commemorating 13 people who played an important role in his life.

Background 
Bernstein wrote this set after similar collections, Seven Anniversaries (1943), Four Anniversaries (1948) and Five Anniversaries (1949–1951). Each movement celebrates a person. Some movements are dedicated to a person close to the one commemorated. The work was given its first performance by Alexander Frey in Berlin in 1998.

Movements 
The titles, referencing the persons, are:
 For Shirley Gabis Rhoades Perle
 In Memoriam: William Kapell (an American pianist who died young in a plane crash).
 For Stephen Sondheim
 For Craig Urquhart
 For Leo Smit (an American composer)
 For My Daughter, Nina
 In Memoriam: Helen Coates (one of Bernstein's most esteemed teachers)
 In Memoriam: Goddard Lieberson (former executive of Columbia Records)
 For Jessica Fleishmann
 In Memoriam: Constance Hope
 For Felicia, on our 28th Birthday (and her 52nd)
 For Aaron Stern
 In Memoriam: Ellen Goetz

References

Sources 
 Horowitz, Mark Eden. Leonard Bernstein Collection. Library of Congress. 11 February 2008.
 Truesdell, F. Donald. “The Complete Works for Solo Piano by Leonard Bernstein.”  American Music, vol. 4, no. 1 (British-American Musical Interactions, Spring, 1986). pp. 120–21.

Compositions by Leonard Bernstein
1988 compositions
Compositions for solo piano